Eric Paul Nesterenko (October 31, 1933 – June 4, 2022) was a Canadian professional ice hockey centre who played in the National Hockey League (NHL) for the Toronto Maple Leafs from 1951 until 1956 and for the Chicago Black Hawks from 1956 until 1972.

Early life
Nesterenko was born in Flin Flon, Manitoba to immigrants from Ukraine. He moved at 16 and attended high school at North Toronto Collegiate Institute. Nesterenko would play as a member of the Toronto Marlboros.

Playing career
Following his long NHL career - in 1973–74 he played for the Chicago Cougars of the World Hockey Association, after a year of coaching in Switzerland. He had 250 goals and 324 assists during his NHL career, and won a Stanley Cup championship with Chicago in 1961. The rangy right winger was a superb penalty killer, who also was known for using his elbows in the corners.

Nesterenko was better known for speed on the ice than for goal-scoring. Chicago sportswriter Bob Markus commented, "I've always thought that Nesterenko would have been the greatest player of all time if they played the game without a puck."

During one game in 1961, Nesterenko infamously attacked Willie O'Ree, the first black player in the NHL, with racial slurs and butt-ended O'Ree with his hockey stick, breaking O'Ree's nose and knocking out his front teeth. O'Ree retaliated with his stick and Nesterenko required 15 stitches in his head.

Personal life
In 1986, he played the father of character Dean Youngblood (Rob Lowe) in the movie Youngblood, and was also the film's hockey consultant. He has worked as a disk jockey, a stockbroker, a travel broker, a freelance writer, a university professor, and a ski instructor.

Near the end of his NHL career, he was interviewed for Studs Terkel's bestselling book, Working: What People do all Day and How They Feel About What They Do.

Eric Nesterenko spent his later life in Colorado and died on June 4, 2022 at the age of 88.

Awards and achievements

WHL championship (1956)
Edinburgh Trophy championship (1956)
Stanley Cup championship (1961)
Played in NHL All-Star Game (1961 and 1965)
Honoured Member of the Manitoba Hockey Hall of Fame

Career statistics

Regular season and playoffs

See also
List of NHL players with 1,000 games played

References

External links
 

1933 births
2022 deaths
Canadian expatriate ice hockey players in Switzerland
Canadian ice hockey centres
Canadian people of Ukrainian descent
Canadian stockbrokers
Chicago Blackhawks players
Chicago Cougars players
Ice hockey people from Manitoba
Sportspeople from Flin Flon
Stanley Cup champions
Toronto Maple Leafs players
Toronto Marlboros players
Western International Hockey League players
Winnipeg Warriors (minor pro) players